Michel Leboucher (born 1956) is a French Polynesian politician and former Cabinet Minister. He is a member of Tahoera'a Huiraatira.

Leboucher is the son of former Territorial Assembly secretary René Leboucher, and the brother of politician Patrick Leboucher. He began his career as a teacher in Catholic education. He was diocesan director of Catholic education in French Polynesia from 1993 to 2014. He failed to win a seat in the Assembly of French Polynesia at the 2013 French Polynesian legislative election, but was eligible in the event of a Ministerial withdrawal. He was subsequently appointed to the cabinet of Gaston Flosse as Minister of Education, Youth and Sports. Following the fall of the Flosse government in September 2014 he returned to the Assembly. He ran as a Tahoera'a candidate in the 2018 election, but failed to win a seat.

References

Living people
1956 births
People from Papeete
French Polynesian educators
Tahoera'a Huiraatira politicians
Members of the Assembly of French Polynesia
Education ministers of French Polynesia
Government ministers of French Polynesia